Tuyekta (Tuyaktı) is a rural locality (a selo) in Tenginskoye Rural Settlement of Ongudaysky District, the Altai Republic, Russia. The population was 329 as of 2016. There are 3 streets.

Geography 
Tuyekta is located on the bank of the Ursul River, 22 km northwest of Onguday (the district's administrative centre) by road. Karakol is the nearest rural locality.

References 

Rural localities in Ongudaysky District